Albert Smith House may refer to:

Albert Smith House (Waldwick, New Jersey), listed on the National Register of Historic Places in Bergen County, New Jersey
Albert Smith House (Salt Lake City, Utah), listed on the National Register of Historic Places in Salt Lake County, Utah